Michael Crowley may refer to:

 Michael Crowley (soldier) (1829–1888), American Civil War soldier and Medal of Honor recipient
 Michael Crowley (baseball), president of the Oakland Athletics
 Michael Crowley (journalist) (born 1972), senior correspondent and deputy Washington bureau chief for Time magazine
 Mike Crowley (born 1975), retired American ice hockey player

See also 
 Michael Crawley (disambiguation)